Rajkot district is one of the 33 districts of the Indian state of Gujarat. Located in Saurashtra peninsula, Rajkot city is the administrative headquarters of the district. It is the third-most advanced district in Gujarat and the fourth most populus.

This district is surrounded by Morbi district in north, Surendranagar and Botad districts in east, Amreli and Junagadh districts in south and Porbandar Jamnagar district in west. The district occupies an area of 11203 km².

Origin of name
The district is named after its headquarters, Rajkot city. The name of the city of Rajkot (literally means the city of princes) was probably derived from Raju Sandhi, the co-founder of the erstwhile princely state of Rajkot in 1620.

Geography

The city is situated between 23°08' North latitude and 20º58' North latitude and 71º40' East longitude and 70º20' East longitude. Rajkot has relatively pleasant climate. The climate does not exhibit a lot of extremities. The summer spans from March to June. The temperature at this time varies between 20 °C and 40 °C. The rainy season spans from July to September. The average amount of rainfall received by the place is 550 mm. The winter months are October to February.

Divisions
The district comprises 11 talukas. These are Paddhari, Lodhika, Dhoraji, Rajkot, Jam Kandorna, Upleta, Jetpur, Kotda Sangani, Jasdan, Vinchhiya and Gondal. About 600 villages are in Rajkot District as per 2011 census data.

There are 8 Vidhan Sabha constituencies in this district:  Rajkot East, Rajkot West, Rajkot South, Rajkot Rural, Jasdan, Gondal, Jetpur and Dhoraji. Tankara, Wankaner, Rajkot East, Rajkot West, Rajkot South, Rajkot Rural and Jasdan constituencies are part of Rajkot Lok Sabha constituency. Gondal, Jetpur and Dhoraji are part of Porbandar Lok Sabha constituency. Morbi is part of Kachchh Lok Sabha constituency.

Transport
Rajkot Airport, located near Rajkot city provides air connectivity with Mumbai, Delhi, Hyderabad, Bangalore, and Goa. The only port of this district was the Port of Navlakhi, an all-weather lighterage port located on the southwest end of the Gulf of Kutch, which now belongs to Morbi district that was introduced later.

The National Highway 8A links Morbi with Kandla. The National Highway 8B connects Rajkot with Porbandar. The National Highway 8D links Jetpur with Junagadh.

Demographics 

According to the 2011 census Rajkot district has a population of 3,804,558, roughly equal to the nation of Liberia or the US state of Oregon. This gives it a ranking of 68th in India (out of a total of 640). Its population growth rate over the decade 2001-2011 was  19.87%. Rajkot has a sex ratio of 924 females for every 1000 males, and a literacy rate of 82.2%.

After bifurcation the population was 3,015,229, of which 1,887,654 (62.60%) lived in urban areas. The divided district had a sex ratio of 923 females per 1000 males. Scheduled Castes and Scheduled Tribes were 235,749 (7.82%) and 19,160 (0.64%) of the population respectively.

In the divided district Hindus were 2,753,712 (91.33%) while Muslims were 222,649 (7.38%) and Jains were 28,297 (0.94%).

At the time of the 2011 Census of India, 96.31% of the population in the district spoke Gujarati and 1.95% Hindi as their first language.

It had a population of 3,169,881 of which 51.29% were urban as of 2001. The literacy rate is 74.85% (2001 census).

Culture 
The District has a considerable population of Sindhi Speaking people and Sindhi tribes such as Sammas, Jadejas etc. There are also some graves of Samma princes of Sindh from Samma Dynasty, that ruled Sindh from 1350 AD to 1520 AD.

Politics
  

|}

Notable personalities 
 Dhumaketu (1892–1965) Writer. Born in Virpur.
 Mohandas Karamchand Gandhi: Born in Porbandar, Mahatma Gandhi grew up in Rajkot and maintained his permanent home in Rajkot for the majority of his life. 
 Jalaram Bapa: Hindu saint. Born in Virpur. 
Shrimad Rajchandra: Spiritual mentor of Mahatma Gandhi, Famous Jain philosopher and thinker 
 Cheteshwar Pujara: Indian National Cricketer. 
 Karsan Ghavri: Indian National Cricketer.
 Pankaj Udhas: Notable Ghazal and Bollywood Singer.
 Manhar Udhas: Notable Ghazal and Bollywood Singer.
 Niranjan Shah: Former Secretary of the Board of Control for Cricket in India (BCCI)
 Vijay Rupani: Gujarat State Chief Minister
Sairam Dave: A popular hasya kalakar (comedian)
Osman Mir: Popular folk singer
Ramesh Mehta: Gujarati film comedian
Hemu Gadhavi: Famous folk Singer

Notes

External links

 Rajkot district collectorate website
 Rajkot RTO

 
Districts of Gujarat